Psechrus hartmanni, is a species of spider of the genus Psechrus. It is endemic to Sri Lanka.

See also
 List of Psechridae species

References

External links
The Spider genera Psechrus and Fecenia

Psechridae
Endemic fauna of Sri Lanka
Spiders of Asia
Spiders described in 2012